Maharashtra Protection of Interest of Depositors (In Financial Establishments) Act, 1999 is an act of Maharashtra state legislature in India to protect the interest of depositors of Maharashtra state in the financial establishments and matters relating thereto.

References

Maharashtra state legislation
Financial regulation in India
1999 in law